David Alexander Ian Adams (born 26 June 1963) is an Australian photojournalist and documentary film maker.

Career
In 1999, the Discovery Channel commissioned the travel adventure series Journeys to the Ends of the Earth, a thirteen-part documentary series which Adams co-produced and presented.

Since 2002 he has produced and directed a series of documentaries through David Adams Films including White Lions – King of Kings, Flight of the Elephants, The Last Mahout, Land of Fear (in the series Journeys to the Ends of the Earth) and Burma's Open Road.

In 2013, David Adams's six-part series Alexander's Lost World premiered around the world. In the series, Adams journeys to Central Asia to investigate possible sites of cities which historians say were founded by Alexander the Great, including the fabled Alexandria on the Oxus. The series also explores the pre-existing Oxus civilization which existed by the Amu Darya since the Bronze Age.

In 2019, David Adams produced a series of documentaries for the History Channel entitled End of Empire: The Rise and Fall of Dynasties which featured films about Tamerlane, Charlemagne, Attila the Hun and Edgar the Peaceful.

References

External links 
 David Adams Films
 Alexander's Lost World

1963 births
Living people
Place of birth missing (living people)
Australian photographers
Australian photojournalists